Steuben Glass is an American art glass manufacturer, founded in the summer of 1903 by Frederick Carder and Thomas G. Hawkes in Corning, New York, which is in Steuben County, from which the company name was derived. Hawkes was the owner of the largest cut glass firm then operating in Corning. Carder was an Englishman (born September 18, 1863) who had many years' experience designing glass for Stevens & Williams in England. Hawkes purchased the glass blanks for his cutting shop from many sources and eventually wanted to start a factory to make the blanks himself. Hawkes convinced Carder to come to Corning and manage such a factory. Carder, who had been passed over for promotion at Stevens and Williams, consented to do so.

In 1918, Steuben was acquired by Corning Glass Works and became the Steuben Division.

In July 2008, Steuben was sold by Corning Incorporated for an undisclosed price to Schottenstein Stores, which also owns 51% of Retail Ventures, a holding company for DSW, Filene's Basement, and formerly Value City Department Stores; Value City Furniture, which changed its name to American Signature Furniture; 15% of American Eagle Outfitters, retail liquidator SB Capital Group, some 50 shopping centers, and 5 factories producing its shoes, furniture and crystal.

On September 15, 2011, Schottenstein announced it was shutting down Steuben's Corning factory and Manhattan store, ending the company's 108-year history. Soon after, Corning Incorporated repurchased the Steuben brand. In early 2014, The Corning Museum of Glass announced that it would work with independent contractors to reproduce Steuben using a new, lead-free formula and their classic leaded crystal.

Carder period (1903-1932)
Steuben Glass Works started operation in October 1903. Carder produced blanks for Hawkes and also began producing cut glass himself. Carder's great love was colored glass and had been instrumental in the reintroduction of colored glass while at Stevens and Williams. When Steuben's success at producing blanks for Hawkes became assured, Carder began to experiment with colored glass and continued experiments that were started in England. He soon perfected Gold Aurene which was similar to iridescent art glass that was being produced by Tiffany and others. Gold Aurene was followed by a wide range of colored art glass that eventually was produced in more than 7,000 shapes and 140 colors.

Steuben Glass Works continued to produce glass of all sorts until World War I. At that time war time restrictions made it impossible for Steuben to acquire the materials needed to continue manufacture. The company was subsequently sold to Corning Glass Works and became the Steuben Division. Carder continued as Division manager without any real change in the company's operation except that he now had reporting responsibilities to Corning Glass Works' management. Corning's management tried, mostly unsuccessfully, to limit the articles that Steuben made to only the most popular. Production continued until about 1932.

In 1932, there was a major change in Steuben management. The nationwide depression had limited the sale of Steuben and there was a lessening of public interest in colored glass. In February 1932, John MacKay was appointed to Carder's position. Carder became Art Director for Corning Glass Works. Steuben then produced primarily colorless art glass.

Steuben still produced colored art glass, but mostly to fill special orders. A few new colors were added after Carder transitioned into his new role with Corning Glass Works, but the last known sale for colored art glass by Steuben was in 1943.

Houghton period (1933–2012)

Corning Glass Works appointed Arthur A. Houghton Jr. as President in 1933, and under his leadership Steuben changed artistic direction toward more modern forms. Using a newly formulated clear glass developed by Corning (referred to as 10M) which had a very high refraction index, Steuben designers developed beautiful, fluid designs. Pieces such as Gazelle Bowl, designed by Sidney Waugh incorporated Art Deco and modernist themes into glass.

The themes during this period included "balustrade" designs for water goblets and candlesticks, footed bowls and serving pieces.  Decorative forms included wildlife pieces representing owls, penguins and other birds in smooth stylistic forms. Some pieces, such as the Ram's Head Candy Dish, playfully included clean lines crowned by an ornate design (a ram's head, complete with a ruff) on the lid as an homage to its classic earlier pieces.

The company also entered into the field of larger show and presentation pieces celebrating various scenes (such as its cut-away design featuring an Eskimo ice fisherman above the ice, and the fish below, or the Cathedral Window design) and elements that incorporated etchings. In some cases sterling silver or gold plating were used on metal finish elements such as the golden "fly" atop the nose of a rainbow trout. Each piece is signed simply with "Steuben" on the underside of the object.

Toward the 1990s, the company also began production of small objects—"hand coolers"—in various animal shapes.

Items from this period were also noted for their careful and elegant packaging. Before boxing, each Steuben piece was placed in a silver-gray flannel bag (stitched with the Steuben name), and then placed in a presentation box.

Designers

Many highly respected glass designers have worked for Steuben Glass, including:

Peter Drobny
Kiki Smith
Peter S. Aldridge
Lloyd Atkins
Inka Benton
James Carpenter
Robert Cassetti
Neil Cohen
Dan Dailey
Michele Oka Doner
David P. Dowler
John Dreve
Paul Haigh
Eric G. Hilton
James Houston
Clain Johnson
Beth Lipman
Dante Marioni
Keith McCarter
Ted Muehling
Donald Pollard
Taf Lebel Schaefer
Paul Schulze
Joel Smith
George Thompson
Massimo Vignelli
Sidney Waugh
Albert Wein
Teri Weidner
Bernard X. Wolff
Rush Dougherty

Notable appearances
Four Steuben pieces, including Gazelle Bowl, were added to the permanent collection of the Metropolitan Museum of Art in 1938.
Steuben was shown at "The World of Tomorrow" exhibition at the New York City World's Fair in 1939.
The Merry-Go-Round Bowl, Audubon Plates, and a pair of Steuben candlesticks were presented to  Queen Elizabeth II on the occasion of her wedding. The bowl and plates were presented by President and Mrs. Truman on behalf of the United States. Since then, and as of 2020, Steuben has been presented as a gift of state by every U.S. president.
Steuben was the only American glassworks to be included in L'Art Du Verre, an exhibition at the Louvre Museum in Paris, where over 150 pieces of Steuben were shown.
The glass bowl in the Merchant Ivory film The Golden Bowl (2000) was designed by Eric Hilton at Steuben Glass.
Steuben glass bowl is mentioned as a wedding gift to the newly married Charlotte York-Macdougal in the 3rd season, episode 13 of Sex and the City. 
President Bartlet broke a Steuben glass pitcher in The West Wing episode "He Shall From Time To Time...".
Sterling Archer broke some Steuben glassware in episode ten, season one of Archer.
In "Christmas Bells", the Act 1 closer of Rent, the ensemble commiserates over their lack of access to classic Christmas tidings, singing "No Steuben glass / No cappuccino maker /...No 'chestnuts roasting on an open fire'".
The glass slipper in the Cinderella Castle Suite at Disney World is made by Steuben Glass.
A Steuben glass egg plays an important part in the movie Risky Business.
Steuben crystal appears a number of times in the apocalyptic novel Lucifer's Hammer by Larry Niven and Jerry Pournelle, where it serves as a metaphor for the fragile beauty of technological civilization.
Steuben glass is mentioned throughout Neil Simon's farce Rumors, which debuted in 1988.
Six Steuben glasses were given to Rose Weismann in the 3rd season, episode 8, in the 2019 Amazon production of The Marvelous Mrs. Maisel.

See also
Carnival glass was also manufactured by Corning
Pressed glass was also manufactured by Corning

Notes

References

The Glass of Frederick Carder - Paul V. Gardner (1971)
Steuben Forever-William Warmus (Glass magazine Winter 2000 Issue 81)
Frederick Carder and Steuben Glass - Thomas P. Dimitroff (1998)
A Guide to Colored Steuben Glass (Book 1) - Eric Erickson (1965)
A Guide to Colored Steuben Glass (Book 2) - Eric Erickson (1965)
Steuben Glass - James S. Plaut (1971)
Frederick Carder's Steuben Glass - Marshall Ketchum (2002)
Carder's Steuben Glass - John F. Hotchkiss (1964)
Steuben: Seventy Years of American Glassmaking - Perrot, Gardner, Plaut (1974)
Asian Artists in Crystal - Steuben Glass (1956)
Poetry in Crystal - Steuben Glass (1963)
The Art of Steuben - Steuben Glass (1972)
A Primer of Glass Design - Steuben Glass
Steuben Glass:An American Tradition in Crystal (first edition)--Mary Jean Madigan (1981)
Steuben Glass: An American Tradition in Crystal (Second Edition) - Mary Jean Madigan (2003)
Steuben Design: A Legacy of Light and Form—Mary Jean Madigan (2004)

External links

The Carder Steuben Club

Glassmaking companies of the United States
Manufacturing companies based in New York (state)
Steuben County, New York
Corning, New York
Corning Inc.